CHN-IX is an internet exchange point based in mainland China. Established in 2016, CHN-IX is a non-profit, neutral and independent peering point. CHN-IX is the first professional Internet Exchange in China.

History

CHN-IX was founded by ChinaCache on April 27, 2016. With technical support from Amsterdam Internet Exchange (AMS-IX), ChinaCache's CHN-IX is based on International Internet Exchange's operation rules and technical standards.

In April 2016, the ChinaCache board announce to create a legal framework to facilitate an expansion into mainland China. CHN-IX CEO Wang Song said that "The new mode of CHN-IX is the first of its kind in China and the high-end customizing orientation of Atecsys International Data Centre is also rare in domestic market."

 In 25 November 2015, ChinaCache Signed Strategic Agreement with AMS-IX to Develop an Internet Exchange.
 In 27 April 2016, ChinaCache launched CHN-IX Data Centre.
 By Aug 2016, CHN-IX has 10 mainstream SP/CP members and the peak traffic has grown to 10 Gbit/s.

Co-locations
Currently, CHN-IX offers access points at Beijing, Guangzhou, Shanghai, Tianjin and Hangzhou, and will launch Zhengzhou, Xi’an and Shenzhen access Point.

See also
 List of Internet exchange points
ChinaCache

References

External links

Traffic statistics
connected Member list

Internet exchange points
Internet in China